Neocollyris feai is a species of ground beetle in the genus Neocollyris in the family Carabidae. It was described by Horn in 1893.

References

Feai, Neocollyris
Beetles described in 1893